Rudolf Koelman (born 1959 in Amsterdam) is a Dutch violinist and is professor for violin at the Zürcher Hochschule der Künste (ZHdK) in Switzerland.

Biography
Koelman studied the violin with Jan Bor and Herman Krebbers in Amsterdam. From the age of 18, he studied with Jascha Heifetz on a full scholarship at the University of Southern California School of Music, now known as the USC Thornton School of Music, in Los Angeles. From 1996 until 1999 he was first concertmaster of the Royal Concertgebouw Orchestra in Amsterdam. 2000-2005 he was Professor for violin and chamber music at the Robert Schumann Hochschule in Düsseldorf, Germany. Currently (since 1987) he is Professor for violin and chamber music at the "Zürcher Hochschule der Künste" (ZHdK) known as Zurich University of the Arts in Switzerland where he also leads the ZHdK Strings chamber orchestra. He is frequently invited as a jury member at international violin competitions and gives masterclasses all around Europe, Asia and Australia.

Instruments
Koelman plays a violin made by Giovanni Francesco Pressenda in 1829 and the "Woolhouse" Stradivarius made in 1720.

Professor

 1984–1989 Professor for Violin and chamber music at the Landeskonservatorium für Vorarlberg in Bregenz & Feldkich, Austria.
 2000–2005 Professor for Violin and chamber music at the Robert Schumann Hochschule in Düsseldorf, Germany. (Professor title and chair for life)
 Since 1987 Professor for violin and chamber music and leader of the ZHdK Strings Orchestra at the Zurich University of the Arts in Switzerland. (Professor title and chair for life)
 Masterclasses at institutions such as: Aurora Sweden, Australian National Academy of Music in Melbourne, Griffith University in Brisbane, International Holland Music Sessions, Keshet Eilon Israel, Conservatorio Vincenzo Bellini Palermo, Perth University, Porto Carras in Greece, Silkroad Summer Sessions, Sweelinck Conservatorium Amsterdam, Sydney Conservatory, Thessaloniki Conservatory, Western Australian Academy of Performing Arts and many more.
Online Master Teacher at iClassical Academy with whom he has recorded several online Masterclasses.

Concertist 
Since 1981 Rudolf Koelman has performed frequently worldwide as a soloist with a large number of renowned orchestras including Bruckner Orchester Linz, WDR Rundfunkorchester Köln,     
Korean Broadcasting System Symphony Orchestra, Orchestre de Chambre de Lausanne, Queensland Symphony Orchestra, Royal Concertgebouw Orchestra, Tokyo Philharmonic Orchestra.

As a soloist, concertmaster or chamber musician he shared the concert stage with musicians such as: Atar Arad, Joshua Bell, Douglas Boyd, Ronald Brautigam, Rudolf Buchbinder, Riccardo Chailly, Sir Colin Davis, Richard Dufallo, Thomas Demenga, Youri Egorov, Chiara Enderle, Dmitri Ferschtman, Liza Ferschtman, Sir John Eliot Gardiner, Nikolaus Harnoncourt, Philippe Herreweghe, Godfried Hoogeveen,  Heinz Holliger, Maris Janssons, Alexander Kerr, Ulrich Koella, Ton Koopman, Hartmut Lindemann, Radu Lupu, Nikita Magaloff, Orfeo Mandozzi, Frederic Meinders, Shlomo Mintz, Viktoria Mullova, Roger Norrington, Antoine Oomen, György Pauk, Thomas Riebl, Nathaniel Rosen, Paul Rosenthal, Kurt Sanderling, Wolfgang Sawallisch, Markus Stocker, Duncan McTier, Jan Willem de Vriend, Raphael Wallfisch, Thomas Zehetmair, Frank Peter Zimmermann, Jaap van Zweden, Conrad Zwicky and many others.

Discography
Rudolf Koelman has made numerous TV-, radio- and CD recordings among them a live recording of all 24 Paganini Capricci.
 J. S. Bach, Eugène Ysaÿe, Edvard Grieg: solosonatas (Grieg with Ferenc Bognàr) 1984 (LP)
 Rudolf Koelman plays his favorite encores: 16 virtuoso compositions with Ferenc Bognàr ORF, 1986 (LP-CD)
 Camille Saint-Saëns, Pablo de Sarasate: Introduction et Rondo Capriccioso, Zigeunerweisen, Musikkollegium Winterthur, 1988
 Julius Conus: Violinconcerto e-minor, with orchestra (live) Take One records, 1990
 Fritz Kreisler: 16 Masterpieces, with Ulrich Koella, Ars, 1991, 
 Johannes Brahms: The Violin Sonatas, with Antoine Oomen, Ars, 1991, 
 Sergei Prokofiev: 2 Sonatas, with Antoine Oomen, Ars, 1993, 
 Johannes Brahms, Gustav Mahler, Alfred Schnittke: Piano Quartetts, Wiediscon, 1994
 Antonio Vivaldi: Le Quattro Stagioni, Ars, 1995, 
 Niccolò Paganini: 24 Capricci, (live)Wiediscon, 1996 & Hänssler Classics, 2004, Naxos, 
 Jean-Marie Leclair: 6 duosonatas with Henk Rubingh, TMD 099801, 1998
 "The Magic of Wood" with 15 instruments of Roberto Regazzi, Dynamic & Florenus, 2005, 
 W. A. Mozart: 2 Duos violin/viola with Conrad Zwicky Wiediscon, 2007
 Wieniawski: Violin concerto No. 2, d-minor Camille Saint-Saëns: Intr. et Rondo Capriccioso, Havanaise, Fremantle Chamber Orchestra/Jessica Gethin FCO, 2008
 Niccolò Paganini: Violin concerto's No.1 & No.2, Netherlands Symphony Orchestra/Jan Willem de Vriend Challenge Classics CC72343 Winner of Edison Award for most popular classical album in the Netherlands, 2010
 "10 years FCO" Pablo de Sarasate: Gypsy Airs, Maurice Ravel: Tzigane, Ernest Chausson: Poème Op. 25, Pyotr Ilyich Tchaikovsky: Souvenir d'un lieu cher Op. 42, Fremantle Chambre Orchestra / Jessica Gethin, Christopher van Tuinen, Rubato Productions, 2015
 Sergei Prokofiev: Violin concerto's No.1 & No.2, Musikkollegium Winterthur/Douglas Boyd, Challenge Classics CC72736, 2017

References

 "The Magic of Wood" from Lutherie to Music, publisher: Florenus Edizioni (English/German/French/Japanese/Dutch) Book 
 "Master Class" written by Herman Krebbers and Niels Le Large, publisher: Herman Lieve (English/Dutch)
 "Oskar Back en veertig jaar Nationaal Vioolconcours" written by Theo Olof, publisher: THOTH-Bussum (Dutch) 
 "Heifetz leerling van god" written by Wenneke Savenije, publisher: Edzeetera-Zandvoort (Dutch)
 "The Umbrella Academy" Comic by Gerard Way and Gabriel Ba, Rudolf Koelman appears on page 82, publisher: Dark Horse Comics 
 "Musical Awakening" by Ryan Howland, publisher: authorHOUSE

External links
 Official Website
 Audio/Video
 Masterclasses
 Zürich University of the Arts
 ZHdK Strings

Dutch classical violinists
Male classical violinists
Violin pedagogues
1959 births
Living people
Musicians from Amsterdam
Conservatorium van Amsterdam alumni
Players of the Royal Concertgebouw Orchestra
Academic staff of the Zurich University of the Arts
21st-century classical violinists